Al Albert may refer to:
                 
 Al Albert (soccer) (born 1949), American college soccer coach               
 Al Albert (sportscaster), American basketball sportscaster
 Giampiero Albertini (1927–1991), sometimes credited as Al Albert, Italian actor
 Al Alberts (1922–2009), American singer and composer